Khondab (also Romanized as Khondāb; also called , Khāndāb) is a city and capital of Khondab County, Markazi Province, Iran. At the 2006 census, its population was 6,982, in 1,787 families.

The heavy water reactor IR-40 is located near this city.

References 

Populated places in Khondab County

Cities in Markazi Province